Amblyomma integrum is a hard-bodied tick of the genus Amblyomma. It is found in India and Sri Lanka. Adults parasitize various larger mammals such as buffalo and cattle, whereas nymphs and larvae use mostly larger and medium mammals. In Sri Lanka, tick was identified as an agent of human otoacariasis.

References

External links
Biology of Amblyomma integrum Karsch, 1897.
Human otoacariasis: a retrospective study from an area of Sri Lanka

Amblyomma
Animals described in 1879